Sovetsky Okrug may refer to:
Sovetsky Administrative Okrug, a division of the city of Omsk, Russia
Sovetsky Territorial Okrug, a division of the city of Lipetsk, Russia
Sovetsky Urban Okrug, a municipal formation of the town of Sovetsk, Kaliningrad Oblast, Russia